Tommy Tricker and the Stamp Traveller is a 1988 Canadian fantasy adventure film written and directed by Michael Rubbo. It is the seventh in the Tales for All series of children's movies created by Les Productions la Fête.

Plot
A young boy, Ralph, and his sister discover a magical ability to travel the world, riding within postage stamps. Complicated by a series of rules, they are soon lost in such far-flung places as Australia and China. Ralph has a stutter, and the film is essentially a coming-of-age story wherein Ralph can speak fluently by the film's end.

Cast
 Anthony Rogers as Tommy
 Lucas Evans as Ralph
 Jill Stanley as Nancy
 Andrew Whitehead as Albert
 Paul Popowich as Cass
 Ron Lea as Brin James
 Han Yun as Mai Ling
 Chen Yuen Tao as Chen Tow
 Catherine Wright as Cheryl
 Rufus Wainwright as Singer

Soundtrack
The film features one of the first appearances of Rufus Wainwright. Wainwright also provides the song I'm a Runnin' and his sister, Martha Wainwright, provides the song "Tommy, Come Back" for the soundtrack.

References

External links

1980s English-language films
1980s Canadian films
1980s children's adventure films
1980s children's fantasy films
1988 films
1980s fantasy adventure films
1988 independent films
Canadian children's fantasy films
Canadian independent films
Canadian fantasy adventure films
English-language Canadian films
Fictional duos
Films about families
Films about friendship
Films directed by Michael Rubbo
Films shot in Montreal
Teen adventure films